Donald McIntosh is a Scottish rifle shooter and coach from Elgin, born July 1966. He represented Scotland for the first time in 1989 at the Commonwealth Shooting Federation Championships in Wales. He has been capped 60 times, making him the seventh most capped Scottish shooter. He represented Scotland in the 2002 Manchester Commonwealth Games where he was unable to replicate his previous gold medal success in the Commonwealth Shooting Federation Championships. Donald began his international coaching career at the 2003 World University Shooting Championships and continues to coach his younger daughter Seonaid McIntosh and coached his older daughter Jennifer McIntosh until her retirement in 2018. He is the owner of Edinkillie Sports Services.

Early life 
Donald was born in July 1966 in Elgin, Moray. His father was a prominent member of Elgin Miniature Rifle Club and Donald was introduced to shooting at a young age.

Education 
He attended Elgin Academy until 1984. He studied Computer Science at the University of Edinburgh (Graduated 1988). He also holds an MSc in Performance Psychology from the University of Edinburgh (2004). He was a prominent member of the University of Edinburgh Rifle Club and was a co-founder of the EU Alumni Club.

Shooting career 
Donald's first Scottish Cap was at the 1989 Commonwealth Shooting Federation (European Division) Championships in Wales and he continued on to represent Scotland a further 59 times. He also shot in the Commonwealth Championships in 1997, 1999 and 2001. He won Gold in the 50m 3-Position pairs event in 1999 and 2001 with Martin Sinclair.

Donald has represented Great Britain in the Dewar, Wakefield and Roberts Matches and travelled to Camp Perry as Coach to the Pershing Trophy Team in 2005.

Coaching career 

 Former Head Rifle Coach at British Shooting (October 2009 – March 2017)
 Former Rifle Coach at Scottish Target Shooting (October 2004 – October 2010)
 Former Programme Manager for Shooting at Scottish Target Shooting then sportscotland Institute of Sport (April 2006 – April 2018)
 Coached and/or Managed Team Scotland at the Melbourne 2006, Delhi 2010, Glasgow 2014 and Gold Coast 2018 Commonwealth Games
 Coached Team GB Rifle at the London 2012, Rio 2016 and Tokyo 2020 Olympics

Awards 

 Inducted into the Scottish Smallbore Rifle Association Hall of Fame 2007.
 Inducted into University of Edinburgh Sports Hall of Fame in 2016.
 Awarded Bob Aitken Service to Shooting Award 2018.
 Awarded Team Scotland Coach of the Year 2019.

References 

1966 births
Living people
People from Elgin, Moray
Sportspeople from Moray
People educated at Elgin Academy, Moray
Alumni of the University of Edinburgh
Scottish male sport shooters
British male sport shooters
ISSF rifle shooters
Shooters at the 2002 Commonwealth Games
Commonwealth Games competitors for Scotland